Thanks to the Moon's Gravitational Pull is the third studio album released by the Filipino alternative rock band Sandwich in 2003. The album contains the singles "Right Now", "2 Trick Pony" and Nahuhulog. It was the last album featuring Marc Abaya as the band's lead vocalist. This was the first Sandwich album initially released independently and also the special edition of the album is the first Sandwich album released under EMI Philippines.

The special edition of the album contains the music videos of "2 Trick Pony and "Thanks to the Moon" and remixes of some songs in the album.

Track listing

Disc one
"Astroholiday" - 4:07
"2 Trick Pony" - 3:57
"For Your Consideration" - 3:02
"Homerun" - 3:55
"Masilungan" -4:19
"Nahuhulog" - 3:31
"Not This Time" - 3:27
"Return To Center" - 3:54
"Right Now" - 4:41
"Scared Shitless" - 4:32
"Surrounded By Dogs" - 4:40
"Thanks to the Moon - 4:29

Disc twoThe second disc is only included in the special edition of the album which was released through EMI in 2004.''

Bonus Songs
"Not This Time (Version Fashown)" - 3:25
"2 Trick Pony (Acoustic)" - 3:48
"Nahuhulog (Wolfmann vs. Buddy mix)" - 4:41
"Right Now (Sunfunk Mix)" - 6:49

Bonus Videos
"2 Trick Pony"
"Nahuhulog"

Personnel
Sandwich
Marc Abaya - vocals, guitar
Raimund Marasigan – vocals, guitar, keyboards
Diego Castillo - guitar, backup vocals
Myrene Academia - bass
Mike Dizon - drums

References

ERASERHEADS Database
Sandwich's EMI page

2003 albums
Sandwich (band) albums